Javiera Catalina Roa Silva (born 27 February 1995) is a Chilean footballer who plays as a forward for Santiago Morning and the Chile women's national team.

International career
Roa made her senior debut for Chile on 29 August 2019 in a 1–0 friendly win against Costa Rica.

References 

1995 births
Living people
Women's association football forwards
Chilean women's footballers
Chile women's international footballers
Footballers at the 2010 Summer Youth Olympics
Colo-Colo (women) footballers
Santiago Morning (women) footballers
Youth Olympic gold medalists for Chile